Geddes Run is a tributary of the Tohickon Creek contained wholly within Plumstead Township, Bucks County, Pennsylvania, in the United States.

History
The first inhabitants of the area of Geddes run were the Lenape people. Many artifacts have been found including 'turtlebacks' fashioned by the Lenape people from a quarry in the area of Geddes Run. The region became part of the Walking Purchase of the family of William Penn in 1737.

The nearby 'bluestone' quarry was operated for many years by Nicholas L. Heaney which supplied thousands of feet of flagstone and curbstone for Doylestown's streets until replaced by concrete.

Statistics
The GNIS I.D. number is 1175497, the U.S. Department of the Interior Geological Survey code number is 03111. Geddes Run meets its confluence at the Tohickon Creek's 0.30 river mile.

Course
Geddes Run is northeast oriented for about half its length, then it turns to the southeast for a short distance then, as it turns back northeast, it picks up an unnamed tributary. It reaches the Tohickon Creek in Pleasant Valley about  before the Tohickon flows into the Delaware River.

Geology
Appalachian Highlands Division
Piedmont Province
Gettysburg-Newark Lowland Section
Lockatong Formation
Geddes Run lies on the Lockatong Formation of rock formed during the Triassic, which consists of argillite, shale, and some impure limestone and calcareous shale.

Crossings and Bridges

See also
List of rivers of the United States
List of rivers of Pennsylvania
List of Delaware River tributaries

References

Rivers of Pennsylvania
Rivers of Bucks County, Pennsylvania
Tributaries of Tohickon Creek